Aimé (1803–1869) and Louis Duthoit (1807–1874) were French draughtsmen, designers and sculptors. They only ever worked in collaboration with each other and so are known collectively as the frères Duthoit (Duthoit brothers).

External links

1803 births
1807 births
1869 deaths
1874 deaths
French sculptors